Posavina may refer to:

Posavina, a geographical region around river Sava in Croatia, Bosnia and Herzegovina, and Serbia
Brod-Posavina County, a county in Croatia
Posavina Canton, a canton in Bosnia and Herzegovina